Jana Hunter/Devendra Banhart is a self-titled split album by Devendra Banhart and Jana Hunter, released in 2005 on LP only by Troubleman Unlimited. It features cover art by Arthur Bates and pressed on yellow vinyl.

All songs on side one by Jana Hunter.  All songs on side two by Devendra Banhart, except as indicated.

Track listing

Side one (Jana Hunter)
"Black Haven" – 2:21
"A Bright-Ass Light" – 2:21
"Crystal Lariat" – 3:01
"That Dragon Is My Husband" – 2:21
"Laughing and Crying" – 1:14

Side two (Devendra Banhart)
"At the Hop" (Devendra Banhart/Andy Cabic)– 2:52
"In Golden Empress Hands" – 2:08
"We All Know" – 2:36
"The Good Red Road" – 3:34
"Little Monkey/Step in the Name of Love" (R. Kelly)– 7:36

References

Devendra Banhart albums
Jana Hunter albums
2005 albums
Split albums